Edward Tick (born April 24, 1951) is an American psychotherapist, author, poet and international pilgrimage guide. He is best known for his work on treating war mental health trauma and post traumatic stress disorder. Tick has been treating Vietnam war veterans since 1979 before the term PTSD came into use. Tick introduced  the identity model approach to PTSD seeing it as a "soul wound", similar to moral injury, rather than primarily a medical or psychological condition. In 2012 Tick presented training on PTSD for 2,000 members of the United States Army Chaplain Corps. Tick was featured in "Forgiveness and Healing" episode of Link TV Global Spirit series.

Education
Tick graduated with a BA degree in English from University at Albany in 1971 and an MS degree in Psychology from Goddard College in 1975. He received a PhD degree in Communication from Rensselaer Polytechnic Institute in 1981

Selected works

Books
 Coming Home In Viet Nam. Tia Chucha Press. 2021. ISBN 978-1882688609.
 The Golden Tortoise. Red Hen Press. 2005. ISBN 978-1597090087.

Articles

References

External links
 Dr. Edward Tick’s website
 2008-09 Tzedek Lecture, Oregon Humanities Center: "War and the Soul" by Dr. Edward Tick, February 18, 2009 in Eugene OR.

American psychotherapists
Rensselaer Polytechnic Institute alumni
1941 births
Living people